Fabrice Soulier (born April 23, 1969 in Avignon, France) is a professional poker player with over $5.5 Million in live poker tournament winnings and won his first bracelet in the 2011 World Series of Poker $10,000 H.O.R.S.E. Championship. In 2013 he was the runner up in the 2013 World Series of Poker Europe €10,000 + 450 No Limit Hold'em - Main Event (Event #6), Earning him €610,000 ($824,513).In March 2014, Fabrice took down the €10,000 + 300	No Limit Hold'em EPT High Roller event for €392,900 ($542,342).

Biography
He was director of the French TV series Farce Attaque (Farce Attack) and Un gars, une fille (A Guy, A Girl) before focusing only on poker.
He now lives in Las Vegas.
He also has been one of the poker teacher for the French show NRJ Pokerstars with Bertrand "Elky"Grospellier.
Then, he created the website www.madeinpoker.fr which is an information site.
In 2009, he cashed in the money for the first time in the $10,000 Main Event finishing in 49th place out of a field of 6,494 players, earning $138,568

World Series of Poker bracelet 

As of 2011, his total live tournament winnings exceed $5,500,000.

References

French poker players
Sportspeople from Avignon
Living people
1969 births
World Series of Poker bracelet winners